La Pinta (Spanish for The Painted One, The Look, or The Spotted One) was the fastest of the three Spanish ships used by Christopher Columbus in his first transatlantic voyage in 1492. The New World was first sighted by Rodrigo de Triana aboard La Pinta on 12 October 1492. The owner of La Pinta was Cristóbal Quintero. The Quintero brothers were ship owners from Palos. The owner of the ship allowed Martín Alonso Pinzón to take over the ship so he could keep an eye on the ship.

La Pinta was a caravel-type vessel. By tradition Spanish ships were named after saints and usually given nicknames. Thus, La Pinta, like La Niña, was not the ship's actual name; La Niña's actual name was the Santa Clara. The Santa María's original nickname was La Gallega. The actual original name of La Pinta is unknown. The origin of the ship is disputed but is believed to have been built in Spain in the year 1441. She was later rebuilt for use by Christopher Columbus.

Detail
The crew size was 26 men under Captain Martín Alonso Pinzón.

The other ships of the Columbus expedition were La Niña (real name Santa Clara)  and Santa María. There are no known contemporary likenesses of Columbus's ships.

Santa María (also known as the Gallega) was the largest, of a type known as a carrack (carraca in Spanish), or by the Portuguese term nau. La Niña and La Pinta were smaller. They were called caravels, a name then given to the smallest three-masted vessels. Columbus once used the word for a vessel of forty tons, but it generally applied in Portuguese or Spanish use to a vessel ranging from 120 to 140 Spanish "toneles". This word represents a capacity about one-tenth larger than that expressed by the modern English "ton".

La Niña, La Pinta, and Santa María were not the largest ships in Europe at the time. Ships built in Europe in the 15th century were designed to sail the Mediterranean Sea and the Atlantic Ocean coastlines. Columbus' smaller-sized ships were considered riskier on the open ocean than larger ships. This made it difficult to recruit crew members, and a small number were jailed prisoners given a light sentence if they would sail with Columbus.

Most of the commerce of the time was the coastal commerce of the Mediterranean, so it was better if ships did not draw much water. As it sailed, the fleet of Columbus consisted of Gallega (the Galician), which he changed to Santa María, La Pinta and La Niña. Of these the first two were about 130 tons. La Niña was much smaller, not more than 50 tons. One writer says that they were all without full decks, that is, that such decks as they had did not extend from stem to stern. Other authorities, however, speak as if La Niña only was an open vessel, and the two larger were decked. Columbus himself took command of Santa María, Martin Alonso Pinzon of La Pinta, and his brothers, Francis Martin and Vicente Yanez, of La Niña. The whole company in all three ships likely numbered 90 men (Santa Maria 40, La Nina 24, La Pinta 26) although some historians cite 120 men.

Replicas

A replica of La Pinta was built by the Spanish government for the Columbian Naval Review of 1893. Along with replicas of Santa María and La Niña, it participated in the review.

Replicas are on display in two locations in Spain:
 at the Wharf of the Caravels (Spanish: Muelle de las Carabelas) in Palos de la Frontera, Andalusia
 in Baiona, Pontevedra, Galicia

In 2008, a replica of La Pinta, although 15 feet (4.5 m) longer and 8 feet (2.4 m) wider than the original, was launched by the Christopher Columbus Foundation. This ship weighs 101 tons and often sails alongside an authentic replica of La Niña, which was launched in 1991.

References

External links

 Florida Museum of Natural History. List of crew members on La Pinta.

Exploration ships
Age of Discovery ships
Individual sailing vessels
Christopher Columbus
1492 in the Spanish West Indies
Spanish West Indies
15th-century ships
Age of Sail individual ships